Jesse Virtanen (born 7 August 1991) is a Finnish professional ice hockey defenceman currently playing for HC Ambri-Piotta in the National League (NL).

Playing career
Virtanen previously played the entirety of his youth and professional career with hometown club, Lukko of the Finnish Liiga. At the completion of the 2016–17 season, his 8th in the Liiga, Virtanen opted for a new challenge in agreeing to a one-year deal with Swedish club, Färjestad BK of the Swedish Hockey League, on April 26, 2017.

Virtanen played two seasons with Färjestad, establishing himself as one of the SHL premier defenders, earning Defenseman of the Year honors after leading all blueliners in scoring with 35 assists and 41 points in 52 games in the 2018–19 season.

On 2 May 2019, Virtanen left Sweden as a free agent to sign a one-year contract with Russian outfit, Traktor Chelyabinsk of the KHL. In the 2019–20 season, Virtanen produced 5 goals and 16 points in 40 games with Traktor before he was traded to Ak Bars Kazan in exchange for Artem Mikheyev and Vyacheslav Osnovin on 23 December 2019.

Virtanen returned to Färjestad BK after a one-year break, with a one-year contract for the period 2020–2021.

Awards and honours

References

External links

1991 births
Living people
Ak Bars Kazan players
HC Ambrì-Piotta players
Lukko players
Färjestad BK players
Finnish ice hockey defencemen
SaPKo players
Traktor Chelyabinsk players
Vaasan Sport players
People from Rauma, Finland
Sportspeople from Satakunta